Cape Cannon is a headland in the Lincoln Sea, Arctic Ocean, North Greenland. Administratively it is part of the Northeast Greenland National Park.

The cape was named by Robert Peary after Henry W. Cannon, one of the members of the Peary Arctic Club in New York.

Geography
Cape Cannon is located at the northern end of Gertrud Rask Land, Peary Land. Benedict Fjord lies to the west of this headland with its mouth between Cape Cannon and Cape Washington.

The glacier discharging just east of the cape is the only one in the area that produces icebergs. About  further to the east there is an unnamed fjord, with its mouth located west of Cape Christian IV

References

External links
 Evolution of the Kap Cannon Thrust Zone (North Greenland)

Headlands of Greenland
Peary Land